Frederick Neuhouser (born 1957) is the Viola Manderfeld Professor of German and a Professor of Philosophy at Barnard College, Columbia University.  He is a specialist in European philosophy of the 18th and 19th centuries, especially Rousseau, Fichte, and Hegel.

Education and career
Neuhouser graduated from Wabash College (Crawfordsville, IN), summa cum laude, 1979, and received his Ph.D. from Columbia University.  Before returning to the Barnard/Columbia faculty, Neuhouser taught at Harvard University, University of California, San Diego, Cornell University and Johann Wolfgang Goethe University Frankfurt am Main.

He was elected a Fellow of the American Academy of Arts & Sciences in 2021.

Philosophical work
Neuhouser's focus is on German Idealism and continental social theory. He has published four books: Fichte's Theory of Subjectivity (Cambridge University Press, 1990);  Foundations of Hegel's Social Theory: Actualizing Freedom (Harvard University Press, 2000), which argues for the centrality of "social freedom" in Hegel's political thought; Rousseau's Theodicy of Self-Love: Evil, Rationality, and the Drive for Recognition (Oxford University Press, 2008); and Rousseau's Critique of Inequality: Reconstructing the Second Discourse (Cambridge University Press, 2014).

His latest work Diagnosing Social Pathology: Rousseau, Hegel, Marx and Durkheim (Cambridge University Press, 2023) is centered on ideas of "social pathology" in 18th, 19th and 20th-century philosophy.

References

External links
Frederick Neuhouser, at www.barnard.columbia.edu

Columbia University faculty
Harvard University faculty
University of California, San Diego faculty
Cornell University faculty
Wabash College alumni
Columbia University alumni
Living people
1957 births
Date of birth missing (living people)